This is a list of World War II-related topic lists:

General topics
 List of theaters and campaigns of World War II
 List of World War II military operations
 List of military operations on the Eastern Front of World War II
 List of military engagements of World War II

Units

Aviation-related

Aces
 List of World War II air aces
 List of World War II aces by country
 List of World War II aces from Australia
 List of World War II aces from Austria
 List of World War II aces from Belgium
 List of World War II aces from Bulgaria
 List of World War II aces from Canada
 List of World War II aces from China
 List of World War II aces from Croatia
 List of World War II aces from Czechoslovakia
 List of World War II aces from Denmark
 List of World War II aces from Finland
 List of World War II aces from France
 List of World War II aces from Germany
 List of German World War II jet aces
 List of World War II aces from Greece
 List of World War II aces from Hungary
 List of World War II aces from Italy
 List of World War II aces from Japan
 List of World War II aces from New Zealand
 List of World War II aces from Norway
 List of World War II aces from Poland
 List of World War II aces from Rhodesia
 List of World War II aces from Romania
 List of World War II aces from Slovakia
 List of World War II aces from South Africa
 List of World War II aces from the Soviet Union
 List of World War II aces from Spain
 List of World War II aces from the United Kingdom
 List of World War II aces from the United States
 List of World War II aces from Yugoslavia

Aircraft
 List of aircraft of World War II
 List of helicopters used in World War II
 List of jet aircraft of World War II
 List of aircraft of the French Air Force during World War II
 List of aircraft of the British, World War II
 List of aircraft of Italy, World War II
 List of aircraft of Japan, World War II
 List of Japanese trainer aircraft during World War II
 List of aircraft of the Luftwaffe, World War II
 List of Luftwaffe aircraft prototype projects during World War II
 List of Luftwaffe aircraft by manufacturer, World War II
 List of aircraft of Russia, World War II
 List of aircraft of the U.S. military, World War II
 List of undersea-carried planes during World War II
 List of units using the B-26 Marauder during World War II

Strategic bombing lists
Numerous wikipages list the series of strategic bombing air raids on various World War II targets:
 Bombing of Berlin in World War II
 Bombing of Braunschweig in World War II
 Bombing of Bremen in World War II
 Bombing of Bucharest in World War II
 Bombing of Cologne in World War II
 Bombing of Dresden in World War II
 Bombing of Duisburg in World War II
 Bombing of Essen in World War II
 Bombing of Friedrichshafen in World War II
 Bombing of Gelsenkirchen in World War II
 Bombing of Germany in World War II
 Bombing of Hamburg in World War II
 Bombing of Kassel in World War II
 Bombing of Kobe in World War II
 Bombing of Leipzig in World War II
 Bombing of Lübeck in World War II
 Bombing of Nordhausen in World War II
 Bombing of Ploiesti in World War II
 Bombing of Sofia in World War II
 Bombing of Tokyo in World War II
 Bombing of U-boat pens and yards in World War II
 Bombing of the United Kingdom in World War II
 Bombing of Vienna in World War II
 Bombing of Würzburg in World War II
 Bombing of Zagreb in World War II

Navy-related
 :List of ship classes of the Second World War
 :List of ships of the Second World War
 :List of World War II ships of less than 1000 tons
 :List of Japanese Navy ships and war vessels in World War II
 :List of United States Navy losses in World War II
 :List of World War II convoys
 :List of broadsides of major World War II ships
 List of major World War II warships built by minor powers

Equipment
 Equipment losses in World War II
List of aircraft carriers of the Second World War
 List of armoured fighting vehicles of World War II
List of battlecruisers of the Second World War
List of battleships of the Second World War
List of coastal defence ships of the Second World War
 List of common World War II infantry weapons
List of corvettes of the Second World War
List of cruisers of the Second World War
List of destroyers of the Second World War
 List of foreign vehicles used by Nazi Germany in World War II
List of frigates of the Second World War
 List of Japanese military equipment of World War II
 List of Japanese World War II army bombs
 List of Japanese World War II navy bombs
 List of Japanese Army military engineer vehicles of World War II
 List of Japanese World War II explosives
 List of Japanese World War II radar
 List of limited service World War II combat vehicles
 List of military vehicles of World War II
List of mine warfare vessels of the Second World War
List of minor warships of the Second World War
List of monitors of the Second World War
 List of prototype World War II combat vehicles
 List of secondary and special-issue World War II infantry weapons
List of submarines of the Second World War
 List of ships of the Second World War
 List of World War II artillery
 List of World War II British naval radar
 List of World War II electronic warfare equipment
 List of World War II firearms
 List of World War II firearms of Germany
 List of World War II guided missiles of Germany
 List of World War II Infantry Anti-Tank Weapons of Germany
 List of World War II military equipment
 List of World War II military gliders
 List of World War II military vehicles of Germany
 List of World War II tanks
 List of World War II torpedoes of Germany
 List of World War II weapons
 List of World War II weapons of France
 List of World War II weapons of Germany
 List of World War II weapons of Italy
 List of World War II weapons of the Soviet Union
 List of World War II weapons of the United Kingdom
 List of World War II weapons of the United States

Miscellaneous
 Glossary of German military terms
 List of Allied propaganda films of World War II
 List of diplomatic missions during World War II
 List of governments in exile during World War II
 List of Japanese-run internment camps during World War II
 List of Japanese World War II military specialists on the USSR
 List of Japanese government and military commanders of World War II
 List of Medal of Honor recipients for World War II
 List of Medal of Honor recipients for the Battle of Iwo Jima
 List of territories occupied by Imperial Japan
 List of World War II conferences
 List of World War II evacuations
 List of World War II films
 Lists of World War II prisoner-of-war camps
 List of World War II video games
 List of World War II war correspondents (1942–43)